Englerodendron vignei is a species of tree in the family Fabaceae endemic to tropical West Africa. It is found in Ghana, Côte d'Ivoire, Liberia, and Sierra Leone. It is threatened by habitat loss.

References

vignei
Flora of West Tropical Africa
Trees of Africa
Vulnerable plants